is a series of third-person hero shooter video games, developed by Byking and Taito, and published by Square Enix. It debuted in arcades on July 12, 2012, with the scenario provided by Norimitsu Kaihō (from Nitroplus) based on a concept by Gen Urobuchi. It uses Silicon Studio's Orochi game engine, and runs on the Taito Type X³ arcade system board.

Its sequel, was released on February 20, 2014, featuring new characters, new battle mechanics, and new stages. Tetsuya Nomura and Akira Yasuda each created two characters exclusively for the game. A sequel, titled , was announced to be released in 2016 for Windows PC. The servers were closed on March 29, 2016.

A fourth game, was released on May 12, 2016. An upgraded version, with four character types and six new weapon packs for each character and several changes to the respawn and awake systems, was released on April 24, 2017.

The servers for the arcade version of Gunslinger Stratos were shut down on April 1, 2021.

An anime adaptation of the game known under its expanded title, Gunslinger Stratos: The Animation, made its premiere on April 4, 2015.

Gameplay
All of the games are played from a third-person perspective, and the player must move around the massive battleground (using the analog sticks and buttons on the two gun controllers), while using the Gun Controllers to aim and shoot at enemies. The goal is to survive and shoot down the rival teams to decrease the opposing team's team meter within a given time limit. The round ends when either teams' team meter drops to zero and/or if the timer reaches zero.

Players can switch weapons in-battle, utilizing various strategies and tactics, by melding the two gun controllers together into different positions, such as:
Side Style: by clipping the side of the gun controllers together, the players can use their character's secondary arsenal.
Tandem Style: by clipping the tip of right gun controller onto the top of the left gun controller, the players can use their character's powerful arsenal.

As the players progressed to the game's multiplayer mode, those who using the NESiCAxLive card can accumulate "Team Points" by winning battles, and using it to purchase and equip "Weapon Packs". Weapons Packs are a set of weapons that can be purchased and use in battle. Some of the packs has upgraded versions of the character's default weapons with boosted stats.

Plot

Setting
Frontier S is an outlaw universe in which freedom runs rampant, while the 17th Far East Imperial City Management District is a totalitarian universe completely bereft of freedom and is under constant surveillance.

Story
The story revolves on a group of gunslingers, each from the two universes who participate in Operation Stratos, particularly on a group of four childhood friends: Tohru Kazasumi, Kyōka Katagiri, Kyōma Katagiri, and Shizune Rindo, who all must confront their own flaws and differences when they battle their alternate selves in order to survive.

References

External links
 Gunslinger Stratos official franchise website
 Gunslinger Stratos official English website
 Game websites:
 Gunslinger Stratos official Japanese website
 Gunslinger Stratos 2 official Japanese website
 Gunslinger Stratos 3/Σ official Japanese website
 Gunslinger Stratos Reloaded official Japanese website

2012 video games
2014 video games
2016 video games
Arcade video games
Action-adventure games
Action video games
Esports games
Hero shooters
Japan-exclusive video games
Light gun games
Mass media franchises
Multiplayer video games
NESiCAxLive games
Parkour video games
Products and services discontinued in 2016
Products and services discontinued in 2021
Fiction about robots
Science fantasy video games
Science fiction video games
Spy video games
Square Enix franchises
Square Enix games
Superhero video games
Taito arcade games
Third-person shooters
Ubisoft franchises
Video games adapted into television shows
Video games about mecha
Video games about robots
Video games about parallel universes
Video games featuring female protagonists
Video game franchises
Video game franchises introduced in 2012
Video games set in the 22nd century
Video games set in Asia
Video games set in Europe
Video games set in Japan
Video games set in London
Video games set in Tokyo
Video games set in the United Kingdom
Windows games
Video games developed in Japan